Carol Mary Oyler (born 12 August 1947) is a New Zealand former cricketer who played as a right-handed batter. She appeared in five Test matches for New Zealand between 1966 and 1969. She played domestic cricket for North Shore.

References

External links
 
 

1947 births
Living people
Cricketers from Auckland
New Zealand women cricketers
New Zealand women Test cricketers
North Shore women cricketers